Wei Ming-ku (born 18 March 1963) is a Taiwanese politician. He served in the Legislative Yuan from 2002 to 2008 and again from 2012 until 2014, when he was elected Magistrate of Changhua County.

Education
Wei received his bachelor's degree in business from National Taichung University of Science and Technology and master's degree in business management from Dayeh University.

Magistrate of Changhua County

2014 Changhua County magistrate election
Wei won the 2014 Changhua County magistrate election held on 29 November 2014.

2016 Japan visit
In August–September 2016, Wei led a business delegation to Japan to promote trade and investment in Changhua County. He also studied the development of the Abeno-ku area.

2018 Changhua County magistrate election

References

External links

 

1963 births
Living people
Democratic Progressive Party Members of the Legislative Yuan
Changhua County Members of the Legislative Yuan
Magistrates of Changhua County
Members of the 8th Legislative Yuan
Members of the 5th Legislative Yuan
Members of the 6th Legislative Yuan